Polydora Fenzl is a genus of plants belonging to the family Asteraceae,  consisting of some 8 species. The genus is related to Vernonia and is native to Sub-Saharan Africa.

Species
 Polydora angustifolia (Steetz) H.Rob. 
 Polydora bainesii (Oliv. & Hiern) H.Rob.
 Polydora chloropappa (Baker) H.Rob.
 Polydora jelfiae (S.Moore) H.Rob.
 Polydora poskeana (Vatke & Hildebr.) H.Rob.
 Polydora serratuloides (DC.) H.Rob.
 Polydora steetziana (Oliv. & Hiern) H.Rob.
 Polydora sylvicola (G.V.Pope) H.Rob.

References

Asteraceae genera